In probability theory and information theory, the variation of information or shared information distance is a measure of the distance between two clusterings (partitions of elements).  It is closely related to mutual information; indeed, it is a simple linear expression involving the mutual information.  Unlike the mutual information, however, the variation of information is a true metric, in that it obeys the triangle inequality.

Definition

Let:

 and 

Then the variation of information between the two partitions is:

.

Explicit information content
We can rewrite this definition in terms that explicitly highlight the information content of this metric.

Let's define the entropy of a partition  as 
, 
where . The entropy of a partition is a monotonous function on the lattice of partitions in the sense that . 
 

.

The difference  is a pseudo-metric as  doesn't necessarily imply that .

.
 
For  as defined above, it holds that the joint information of two partitions coincides with the entropy of the meet

Identities
The variation of information satisfies

,

This can be rewritten as

,

,

The variation of information can also be bounded, either in terms of the number of elements:

,

Or with respect to a maximum number of clusters, :

References

Further reading

External links
 Partanalyzer includes a C++ implementation of VI and other metrics and indices for analyzing partitions and clusterings
 C++ implementation with MATLAB mex files

Entropy and information
Summary statistics for contingency tables
Clustering criteria